The 1993 UCLA Bruins football team represented the University of California, Los Angeles in the 1993 NCAA Division I-A football season.  They played their home games at the Rose Bowl in Pasadena, California and were coached by Terry Donahue. It was Donahue's 18th season as the UCLA head coach.  The Bruins finished 8–4 overall, and were Pacific-10 Conference co-champions with a 6–2 record.  The Bruins were invited to play in the Rose Bowl against Wisconsin on January 1, 1994. The team was ranked #18 in the final AP Poll and #17 in the final Coaches Poll.

Pre-season

Schedule

Game summaries

Wisconsin (Rose Bowl) 

The weather was 73 degrees and hazy. UCLA receiver J. J. Stokes set Rose Bowl records for receptions (14) and receiving yards (176).  Brent Moss gashed the UCLA defense for 158 rushing yards and 2 TDs.

First quarter scoring: UCLA — Bjorn Merten 27-yard field goal; Wisconsin — Brent Moss three-yard run (Rick Schnetzky kick)

Second quarter scoring: Wisconsin — Moss one-yard run (Schnetzky kick)

Third quarter scoring: No Scoring

Fourth quarter scoring: UCLA — Ricky Davis 12-yard run (Merten kick); Wisconsin — Darrell Bevell 21-yard run (Schnetzky kick); UCLA — Mike Nguyen five-yard pass from Wayne Cook (2-point conversion pass failed)

Roster

Statistics

Awards and honors
All-Americans: Marvin Goodwin (S), Bjorn Merten (PK, consensus), Jamir Miller (OLB, consensus), Craig Novitsky (OG), Vaughn Parker (OT), J.J. Stokes (WR, consensus)
 All-Conference First Team: Marvin Goodwin (SS), Bjorn Merten (PK), Jamir Miller (OLB), Craig Novitsky (OG), Vaughn Parker (OT), Darren Schager (P), J.J. Stokes (WR)

References

UCLA
UCLA Bruins football seasons
Pac-12 Conference football champion seasons
UCLA Bruins football